Cynthia Yvonne Forde ("Cinthy", March 1, 1952) is a Barbados born politician, first Vice Chairman of the Barbados Labour Party,  member of the Barbados Union of Teachers.  She has represented Saint Thomas in the House of Assembly of Barbados since 2001.

Biography
Cynthia Yvonne Forde born and raised in the rural parish of St. Thomas. Forde studied at the Modern High School, Erdiston Teacher Training College and Licentiate College of Preceptors. She has passed courses in Early Children Education in Israel, in the Barbados Institute of Management and Productivity and in Industrial Relations in Washington, D.C.

Cynthia Forde is considered one of Barbados veteran politicians. Her work experience started as a cashier for one year, then for 25 years she taught at a primary school. MP Forde is the current Member of Parliament for St. Thomas, she has served the constituency as MP for over 20 years. She has held number of important and top positions in government including Senator, Parliamentary Secretary, Minister of State and Cabinet Minister. She was Parliamentary Sectary and Minister of State  in the Ministry of Education, Youth Affairs and Culture (1994-2001), later she won the St. Thomas By-Election and became Minister of State in the Ministry of Education, Youth Affairs and Sport, while in that Ministry Forde worked closely and still works  with current Prime Minister Mia Amor Mottley who at that time was Minister of Education, Youth Affairs and Sport. In 2018 when the Barbados Labour Party was elected Forde was appointed as Minister of People Empowerment and Elder Affairs. After The Barbados Labour Party was re-elected in 2022 Forde declined to serve in the Cabinet again. In the 2018 election she received the 2nd highest of votes from the electorate.
Forde has also served various top positions in the Barbados Labour Party such as General Sectary, 1st Vice Chairman, 2nd Vice Chairman and 3rd Vice Chairman. 
Apart from serving in government and party positions Forde was the former President of the Association of Friends of the Gordon Cummins District Hospital, former Executive Member of the Barbados Union of Teachers(BUT), former  member of the Community Independence Celebration Committee, former  member of Sharon Primary Parent-Teacher Association, former President of the Alleyne School Parent Teacher Association and a long standing member of the Holy Innocents Anglican  Church Council - A Representative of the Anglican Church just to name a few.

Family
Forde is the mother of one son and four grandchildren 2 boys and 2 girls.

References

External links 
Miss Cynthia Y. Forde, J.P., M.P.
2001 election campaign website

1952 births
Living people
Barbadian educators
Barbadian politicians
Members of the House of Assembly of Barbados